Edith Margaret Faulstich (May 22, 1907 – September 4, 1972) of New Jersey and New York City, was a philatelist and philatelic journalist who specialized in postal history and postal covers. She encouraged the development of that field in philately.

Family history
She was born as Edith Margaret VanderPoel, daughter of Andrew Case VanderPoel and Margaretha Bollinger.

As a child, Faulstich developed the nickname "Dee."  The development and transformation of the name came from her Swiss-German grandfather, Conrad Bollinger who was from Beringen. Whenever he tried to pronounce "Edith" it always came out "Edit."  It sounded like he was always saying "eat it". To avoid embarrassment, he began calling her Dee. Thereafter, and throughout the remainder of her life, she was known as "Dee."

Faulstich's family history dates back to the 16th century, with the Bollinger's coming from Berigen, Switzerland and the VanderPoel's coming from Holland. The VanderPoel family is derived from the VanderPoels who owned property and sawmills on the Hudson River and lived within the surrounding area of Kinderhook, Columbia County, New York Ref. Map of the Division of Kinderhoock, Patent Granted in 1686.

Raised in Montvale, New Jersey, she attended Park Ridge High School and New York University.

Collecting interests
Faulstich started stamp collecting as a hobby with her two young sons. In the beginning, 
it was a way for Faulstich and her children to do something together. 
Faulstich "had a 'yen,' a longing, to write" and she was not a shy person.

In the beginning with her philatelic work, Faulstich wanted to know how people 
communicated before preprinted government stamps, before 1840. She then wanted to 
promote and increase awareness about the value and need for postal history.

Faulstich spent 25 years researching the postal mail of the American Expeditionary Forces who were forgotten about and left in Siberia, from 1917 to about 1920, after World War I. Her research, files and letters were donated to Stanford University, after her death. And, a very limited publication of her book was edited and published privately by her sons for the families of the Siberian soldiers she corresponded with.

Postal history of the world 
Many of Faulstich’s postal history collections were rated as world class. Possession of her list of collections 
is noted in the Robert A. Segal Auction 120 East 54th Street, New York, NY 10220. The following is a sample partial list of a few of 
Edith M. Faulstich's collections.

 Two of her most important collections were Canadian Expeditionary Forces in Siberia during World War I and American Expeditionary Forces in Siberia. see reference, Hover Institute, Stanford University, California,
 Earliest Forms of Written Communication
 Covers of a Great Age. 14th-17th Century, Europe and Mediterranean Areas (Italy, Central Europe, Belgium, France, Netherlands, Greece, Switzerland
 "Cito" Covers which were considered the first regular special delivery covers.  This is also a subject upon which Faulstich wrote a monograph based on her collection
 The Evolution of the Envelope. A specialized collection of 37 cover from the old parchment scrolls, self-tied strips of parchment up to 1830 when the envelope was well developed
  French Civilian Covers
  French Autographs
  War Covers
  North Russia "Operation Polar Bear"
  Disaster Covers
 America-Colonial Covers Before French & Indian War (1677–1742)
 French & Indian War Covers (1755–1763)
 Canada Covers (1767–1814)
 The McKenzie Rebellion Letters ( 1837–1938)
 Prisoner of War Covers, Siberia
 United States, Stampless Covers
 Ship & Railroad Markings
 Westerns & Territorials
 Valentine Covers
 Civil War Patriotic Covers
 1860 Pictorial Issue
 Bank Note Issues
 Switzerland
 Texas Covers Specialized
 United States PostMaster Provisionals

Philatelic literature
In addition she wrote stamp columns for the following newspapers and publications:

1) 'Newark Sunday News' for 26 year (Nov. 24, 1946–1972), 
2) 'The Record", Hackensack, New Jersey ( 1961–1966),
3) 'Bergen Evening Record" (January 16, 1922 -Sept 14, 1968),

Faulstich was also editor of: 
4) Postal History Journal from May 1957 (Vol.1. No.1) to 1967, 
5) Western Stamp Collector, 
6) Covers, and 
7) The Essay-Proof Journal.

Philatelic activity
Faulstich was a founding member of the Postal History Society of the Americas (later renamed the Postal History Society (PHS), Inc.) and dedicated much of her time campaigning for the acceptance of postal history as a valid category of philatelic exhibitions. She was the first woman president of the PHS.

Honors and awards 
Edith Faulstich was inducted into the American Philatelic Society Hall of Fame in 1973.

See also
 Philately
 Philatelic literature

References

External links
 Edith M. Faulstich's, Life History, Her Philatelic Articles & Historic Resources
 Edith Margaret Faulstich
 Library of Congress Archives, Newspaper and Periodical Room, MicroFilm # 1290
 Hoover Institution, 434 Galvez Mall, Stanford University, Stanford, CA 94305-6010
 Edith M. Faulstich collection, 1918–1975, Location: Hoover Arch.: Stacks, Call Number: XX(4089165.1), Collection Name: Faulstich, Edith M. d. 1972, collector, 27 ms. boxes, 18 envelopes, 7 album boxes.

20th-century American journalists
20th-century American women writers
1907 births
1972 deaths
American Philatelic Society
American philatelists
American women journalists
Journalists from New Jersey
Journalists from New York City
New York University alumni
Park Ridge High School alumni
People from Montvale, New Jersey
People from Flatbush, Brooklyn
Philatelic literature
Edith Margaret
Women philatelists